Per Mørch Hansson (4 March 1905 – 6 October 1994) was a Norwegian sportsman who competed in tennis, ski jumping and sailing, and businessperson.

He was born in Aker. He graduated with a cand.jur. degree in 1926. From 1940 he was the chief executive officer of the insurance company Storebrand. He was chairman of the board of Det Norske Luftfartsselskap, and board member of various companies, including Den norske Creditbank, Saugbrugsforeningen, Elektrokemisk and Sulitjelma Gruber. He was decorated Commander of the Order of St. Olav in 1965.

He represented IF Ready and won the national championship in tennis men's double 1931, 1932 and 1933 with Ragnar Hagen.

References

1905 births
1994 deaths
Sportspeople from Oslo
Norwegian male tennis players
Norwegian male ski jumpers
Norwegian male sailors (sport)
Norwegian businesspeople in insurance
20th-century Norwegian people